Lake View is a city in Tuscaloosa County, Alabama, United States. At the 2010 census the population was 1,943, up from 1,357 in 2000. It is part of the Tuscaloosa, Alabama Metropolitan Statistical Area. It is located approximately halfway between Tuscaloosa and Birmingham via Interstates 20 and 59.

History
Lake View was incorporated in 1998.

Geography
Lake View is located at  (33.279933, -87.138667).

Demographics

At the 2000 census there were 1,357 people, 457 households, and 405 families in the town. The racial makeup of the town was 97.35% White, 0.81% Black or African American, 0.07% Native American, 0.22% Asian, and 1.55% from two or more races. 0.22% of the population were Hispanic or Latino of any race.
Of the 457 households 44.4% had children under the age of 18 living with them, 82.3% were married couples living together, 3.7% had a female householder with no husband present, and 11.2% were non-families. 10.1% of households were one person and 3.7% were one person aged 65 or older. The average household size was 2.97 and the average family size was 3.17.

The age distribution was 28.8% under the age of 18, 6.6% from 18 to 24, 36.6% from 25 to 44, 20.6% from 45 to 64, and 7.4% 65 or older. The median age was 34 years. For every 100 females, there were 100.7 males. For every 100 females age 18 and over, there were 100.0 males.

The median household income was $54,879 and the median family income  was $60,119. Males had a median income of $37,583 versus $29,688 for females. The per capita income for the town was $22,096. About 2.8% of families and 5.1% of the population were below the poverty line, including 6.8% of those under age 18 and 4.2% of those age 65 or over.

2010 census
At the 2010 census there were 1,943 people, 676 households, and 564 families in the town. The racial makeup of the town was 93.9% White, 4.2% Black or African American, 0.1% Native American, 0.7% Asian, and .9% from two or more races. 0.6% of the population were Hispanic or Latino of any race.
Of the 676 households 39.3% had children under the age of 18 living with them, 73.2% were married couples living together, 6.4% had a female householder with no husband present, and 16.6% were non-families. 13.2% of households were one person and 3.9% were one person aged 65 or older. The average household size was 2.87 and the average family size was 3.16.

The age distribution was 26.4% under the age of 18, 7.1% from 18 to 24, 30.8% from 25 to 44, 27.5% from 45 to 64, and 8.3% 65 or older. The median age was 35.9 years. For every 100 females, there were 96.9 males. For every 100 females age 18 and over, there were 97.8 males.

The median household income was $77,750 and the median family income  was $81,250. Males had a median income of $53,646 versus $37,109 for females. The per capita income for the town was $28,334. About 0% of families and 2.4% of the population were below the poverty line, including 0% of those under age 18 and 0% of those age 65 or over.

See also

 List of towns in Alabama

References

External links

Towns in Alabama
Towns in Tuscaloosa County, Alabama
Tuscaloosa, Alabama metropolitan area